Elachista delocharis is a moth of the family Elachistidae that  is endemic to Ethiopia.

References

delocharis
Moths described in 1932
Endemic fauna of Ethiopia
Insects of Ethiopia
Moths of Africa